Paul Byrne is an Irish retired sportsperson.  He played hurling with his local club Thurles Sarsfield's and was a member of the Tipperary senior inter-county team in the 1960s and 1970s. Byrne won his sole set of All-Ireland and Munster winners' medals with Tipp in 1971.

Paul is an accomplished button accordion player and former primary school principal.

References

1940s births
Living people
Thurles Sarsfields hurlers
Tipperary inter-county hurlers
All-Ireland Senior Hurling Championship winners